Tanle Bay or Baie de Tanle is a bay in northwestern New Caledonia. It lies just northwest of Nehoue Bay, separated only by Tanle Island and Boh Island.
Banare Bay lies to the northwest.

References

Bays of New Caledonia